Kiss Me Like a Lover is a Canadian drama film from Quebec, directed by André Forcier and released in 2016.

Set in Montreal in the 1940s, the film stars Émile Schneider as Pierre Sauvageau, a young man who wants to register for the military in World War II but must stay home to care for his paraplegic twin sister Berthe (Juliette Gosselin) as their mother (Céline Bonnier) struggles with depression. With the intimacy of care awakening her dormant sexuality, Berthe attempts to seduce Pierre; although Pierre rejects the advance, the memory of the incident goes on to colour his subsequent relationship with Marguerite (Mylène Mackay), his best friend's girlfriend, and Berthe's relationship with Élio (Tony Nardi), a university professor. The film's cast also includes Antoine Bertrand, Réal Bossé, Roy Dupuis, France Castel, Denys Arcand, Pascale Montpetit, Julien Poulin, Rémy Girard, Christine Beaulieu, Pier-Luc Funk, Geneviève Schmidt, Benoît Brière and Marc Hervieux.

The film received nine Prix Iris nominations at the 19th Quebec Cinema Awards, including  Best Supporting Actor (Nardi), Best Supporting Actress (Bonnier) and Best Screenplay (Forcier and Linda Pinet).

References

External links

2016 films
Canadian drama films
Films directed by André Forcier
Films set in Montreal
French-language Canadian films
2010s Canadian films